L'Imitation de Notre-Dame la Lune (The Imitation of Our Lady the Moon) (1886) is a collection of poems by the French poet Jules Laforgue. It is dedicated to Gustave Kahn and "to the memory of little Salammbô, priestess of Tanit". It contains the following twenty-two poems:

 "Un mot au Soleil pour commencer"
 "Litanies des premiers quartiers de la lune"
 "Au large"
 "Clair de lune"
 "Climat, faune et flore de la lune"
 "Guitare"
 "Pierrots"
 "Pierrots (On a des principes)"
 "Pierrots (Scène courte mais typique)"
 "Locutions des Pierrots"
 "Dialogue avant le lever de la lune"
 "Lunes en détresse"
 "Petits mystères"
 "Nuitamment"
 "États"
 "La lune est stérile"
 "Stérilités"
 "Les linges, le cygne"
 "Nobles et touchantes divagations sous la lune"
 "Jeux"
 "Litanies des derniers quartiers de la lune"
 "Avis, je vous prie"

English translations
Selections from L'Imitation have been translated by William Jay Smith and Graham Dunstan Martin, and in its entirety by Peter Dale.

References
 Laforgue, Jules (1956). Selected Writings of Jules Laforgue. Trans. William Jay Smith.  New York: Grove/Atlantic, Inc.
 Laforgue, Jules (1999). Jules Laforgue: Selected Poems. Trans. Graham Dunstan Martin. Penguin. .
 Laforgue, Jules  (2001). Poems. Trans. Peter Dale. London: Anvil Press.  .

External links
The complete text of L'Imitation de Notre-Dame la Lune 

French poetry collections
1885 books
19th-century French literature